The Cambridgeshire and Peterborough Combined Authority is a combined authority covering the ceremonial county of Cambridgeshire in the East of England. The authority was established on 3 March 2017. The authority is led by the directly elected Mayor of Cambridgeshire and Peterborough.

History
Plans for a combined authority covering the entirety of East Anglia, including Norfolk and Suffolk, were announced by Chancellor of the Exchequer George Osborne on 16 March 2016 as part of the 2016 United Kingdom budget, with the aim of creating an "Eastern Powerhouse" analogous to the government's Northern Powerhouse concept. Norfolk and Suffolk had initially submitted separate devolution bids, but government ministers called for a joint bid including all three counties. Initial proposals had been agreed by all county and district councils in the region, with the exception of Cambridge City Council.

The East Anglia devolution deal was subsequently rejected by Cambridgeshire County Council, with Peterborough City Council also opposing the deal. Plans for devolution in the region were split in June 2016, with one deal for Cambridgeshire and Peterborough and a separate deal covering Norfolk and Suffolk. The Norfolk and Suffolk devolution deal was later scrapped, after several district councils withdrew.

The devolution deal was agreed by the constituent local councils in November 2016, and the first meeting of the shadow combined authority was held in December 2016. The draft statutory instrument required for formal establishment of the combined authority was laid in Parliament on 23 January, made on 2 March 2017, and came into force the following day.

Responsibilities

As part of the devolution deal, the responsibilities of the combined authority will include the following:
 A £600 million budget for local economic growth (£20 million over 30 years)
 A £170 million budget for housing, including affordable and council housing, with £70 million specifically for housing in Cambridge
 Transport infrastructure improvement and maintenance
 Provision of skills training and apprenticeships
 Integration of local health and social care resources
 Integration of local employment services, and design of a National Work and Health Programme alongside the Department for Work and Pensions

Mayor

The combined authority is chaired by a directly elected mayor. The first election was held on 4 May 2017 for a four-year term of office, with further elections in May 2021 and every fourth year thereafter. The mayor's salary has been reported to be £70,000 a year.

Membership

In addition to the elected mayor, the seven constituent local councils, Cambridgeshire County Council, Peterborough City Council, Cambridge City Council, East Cambridgeshire District Council, Fenland District Council, Huntingdonshire District Council and South Cambridgeshire District Council, each nominate one member of the combined authority. The Chairman of the Business Board, which functions as the Local Enterprise Partnership for the region, also holds a seat. Substitute members are also nominated in case of absence.

Bodies that hold observer status currently include the Cambridgeshire and Peterborough Clinical Commissioning Group, the Cambridgeshire and Peterborough Fire Authority and the Cambridgeshire Police and Crime Commissioner.

References

External links
 Cambridgeshire and Peterborough Combined Authority official website
 Cambridgeshire and Peterborough Combined Authority: Meetings and agendas
 Cambridgeshire and Peterborough Combined Authority on Facebook
 Cambridgeshire and Peterborough Combined Authority on Twitter
 Devolution for Cambridgeshire and Peterborough, Cambridgeshire County Council

Combined authorities
Local government in Cambridgeshire